The 2015 2014–2016 CSV Beach Volleyball Continental Cup were a beach volleyball double-gender event. The winners of the event will qualify for the 2016 Summer Olympics

Men

First round

Group A

Group B

Group C

Group D

Brazil, Venezuela, Chile, and Argentina qualified for final round.

Second round

Group E

Qualified for Group F

Group F

Qualified for final round

Women

First round

Group A
Venue:  Escola de Educação Física do Exército, Rio de Janeiro, Brazil

|}

|}

Group B

Group C

Group D

Brazil, Venezuela, Chile, and Argentina qualified for final round.

Second round

Group E

Qualified for Group F

Group F

Qualified for final round

Final round

Men

Women
The final round was played 22 - 26 June 2016.
Venue:  Rosario, Argentina

 
  qualified to the 2016 Olympics.
  and  qualified to the World Continental Cup.

References

External links
Official website

2014 in beach volleyball
2015 in beach volleyball
2016 in beach volleyball
Beach volleyball competitions
Continental Beach Volleyball Cup